USS Parker (Destroyer No. 48/DD-48) was an  built for the United States Navy prior to the American entry into World War I. The ship was the first U.S. Navy vessel named in honor of Foxhall A. Parker, Jr., a U.S. Navy officer who served in the American Civil War, and as Superintendent of United States Naval Academy.

Parker was laid down by William Cramp & Sons of Philadelphia in March 1912 and launched in February 1913. She was armed with four  guns and had eight 18 inch (450 mm) torpedo tubes.

After her January 1914 commissioning, she assisted her sister ship  when that ship suffered an explosion in one of her fire rooms in April. After the U.S. entered World War I in April 1917, Parker served as an escort for the fourth group of the first American troop convoy of the war. Afterwards, she patrolled the Irish Sea out of Queenstown, Ireland. Parker rescued nine survivors of a torpedoed British hospital ship in February 1918, and her crew received accolades from the British Parliament, the Admiralty, and U.S. Navy officials.

Upon returning to the U.S. after the war in July 1919, Parker rejoined the Atlantic Fleet. Parker was decommissioned in June 1922. She was struck from the Naval Vessel Register in March 1935, and ordered scrapped in April.

Design and construction
Construction of the vessel — like her three sister ships — was awarded to William Cramp & Sons of Philadelphia which laid down her keel on 11 March 1912. On 8 February 1913, Parker was launched by sponsor Mrs. Henry W. Hand, wife of the vice president of the Cramp shipyard. The ship was the first U.S. Navy vessel to be named for Foxhall A. Parker, Jr., a U.S. Navy officer who served in the American Civil War, and as Superintendent of United States Naval Academy; he was also a co-founder of the United States Naval Institute.

Parker had two steam turbines that drove her two screw propellers, and an additional pair triple-expansion steam engines, each connected to one of the propeller shafts, for cruising purposes.

Parker was also equipped with four twin mount  torpedo tubes.

Pre-World War I
Parker was commissioned into the United States Navy on 30 December 1913 under the command of Lieutenant Commander C. P. Nelson. An explosion ripped through the forward fire room on Aylwin, injuring three men. Benham loaded the three wounded sailors and sped to the naval hospital at Norfolk, Virginia, while Parker took on the remainder of Aylwins crew. One of the injured men died on Benham before landfall was made in Virginia; another died a short time later. Aylwin remained afloat but, unmanned, was towed into Norfolk by Parker and U.S. Navy tug . The crews of all three destroyers raised $250 to help defray funeral expenses for the widow of one of the men.

In early April 1915, Parker and destroyer  were temporarily assigned to patrol near the New York City Quarantine Station. There were concerns by Dudley Field Malone, the local port collector, that some of the interned German steamships at New York might try to slip out during a heavy snowstorm. As a part of these patrols, Malone discovered what The New York Times termed a "widespread conspiracy" intended to supply British warships outside U.S. territorial waters, in violation of the American neutrality in World War I.

After participating in winter maneuvers in Cuban waters in early 1917, Parker joined the fleet at Yorktown, Virginia, in March, immediately prior to the American entry into World War I.

World War I
After the U.S. entered World War I on 6 April 1917, Parker was selected for overseas duty. She sailed on 17 June as an escort for the fourth group of the first American convoy, which carried units of the American Expeditionary Force. The group departed from New York for Brest, France, steaming at an  pace. A thwarted submarine attack on the first convoy group, and reports of heavy submarine activity off of Brest, resulted in a change in the convoy's destination to Saint-Nazaire where the convoy arrived 2 July.

From St. Nazaire, Parker steamed to Queenstown, Ireland, joining the U.S. Naval Forces patrolling the Irish Coast. There she escorted convoys safely through the war zone, and assisted vessels in distress. From July–November 1918, Parker was attached to the base at Plymouth, England, and operated with U.S. submarine chasers. Parker made contact with German submarines on several occasions during the war. She was credited with probably seriously damaging an enemy submarine on 3 August 1917.

On 26 February 1918, Parker assisted in rescuing nine survivors of British hospital ship , which had been torpedoed by German submarine . The men of Parker were commended by the British Parliament, the Admiralty, and the U.S. naval authorities. On 1 November, Parker sailed from Plymouth for Gibraltar but returned to Plymouth at the end of the war.

Postwar
After returning to Plymouth after the Armistice was signed, Parker carried mail and passengers between Plymouth and Brest. She made a cruise to German ports in early 1919 to implement the terms of the armistice, before steaming to the Baltic Sea to assist members and vessels of the American Relief Administration. Parker sailed for New York on 20 July 1919 and, upon arrival, was assigned to Destroyer Squadron 1, Atlantic Fleet.

The destroyer was based out of Norfolk, Virginia from 1919-mid-1921. In July 1920, Parker was operating in the Mediterranean when she played a role in the search for an American missionary couple, Paul Nilson and Harriet Fisher Nilson, thought abducted by Turkish Nationalists. Parker was sent to Mersina to demand the release of the pair, and dispatched messages by airplane to Tarsus and Adana to that effect.

After making a final cruise to Newport, Rhode Island, in mid 1921, Parker was decommissioned on 6 June 1922. After 13 years in reserve, the ship was struck from the Naval Vessel Register on 8 March 1935, and, on 23 April, was ordered scrapped.

Notes

References

Bibliography

External links

Aylwin-class destroyers
Ships built by William Cramp & Sons
1913 ships
World War I destroyers of the United States